Pody is a rural locality (a selo) in Chernoyarsky District, Astrakhan Oblast, Russia. The population was 798 as of 2010. There are 27 streets.

Geography 
Pody is located 33 km northwest of Chyorny Yar (the district's administrative centre) by road. Staritsa is the nearest rural locality.

References 

Rural localities in Chernoyarsky District